Nijagal Kempohalli   is a village in the southern state of Karnataka, India. It is located in the Nelamangala taluk of Bangalore Rural district.

Demographics 
Nijagal Kempohalli had population of 563 of which 285 are males while 278 are females as per report released by Census India 2011.

Geography 
The total geographical area of village is 192.28 hectares.

Bus Route from Bengaluru City 
Yeshwantapura  - Nelamangala - Dobaspete

See also 

 Beeragondanahalli
 Bengaluru Rural District

References

External links 

Villages in Bangalore Rural district